William Campbell (1793––1864) was Scottish draper, businessman and philanthropist. With his brother, James, he formed company called "J. & W. Campbell & Co., General  Warehousemen." The company grew over many years and formed an international business. Having made his fortune William bought Tullichewan Castle, and continued to work while giving generously to philanthropic projects.

Early life and education
The family was known in the district by the name of McOran. They claimed descent from the Campbells of Melfort, and resumed their old name of Campbell on settling in Glasgow. William's mother Helen, was daughter of John Forrester of Frew, near Kippen, a farm tenanted by her family from the Earls of Moray for more than three hundred years. All  the  schooling,  strictly  so  called,  which  he  ever  got,  he  received  at  the  parish  school. William Campbell was a grandson of  James Campbell, Esq. of Ashentree, Perthshire, a cadet of the Melfort branch of the Argyll Campbells.

Glasgow and work
In  1805,  when  he  was  about  eleven  or  twelve  years  of  age,  his  father  moved  with  his  family  to  Glasgow,  with  the  view  of  finding  in  that  centre  of  industry  suitable  employments  for  his  children. Offers  of  assistance  were  made  him  and  he  (having  now  attained  the  age  of  twenty-two)  resolved  to  start  in  business  on  his  own  account. The  building has  since  been  demolished,  in  order  to  make  way  for  London  Street. Here  he  was very successful. The  warehouse  was  crowded  from  morning  till  night. A  partnership  was  formed  between  the  two  brothers,  and  the  firm  was,  conducted  under  the  name  of  "J.  &  W.  Campbell  &  Co.,  General  Warehousemen." Under  their  joint  management  the  same  extraordinary  success  as  before  continued  to  attend  them,  until  every  flat  and  attic  of  the  old  tenement  being  turned  to  use,  they  were  compelled  to  contemplate the  necessity  of  leaving  the  too  contracted  premises,  and  seeking  more  commodious  accommodation  elsewhere. They  got  notice  to  quit  it  in  fifteen  months. This  of  course  subjected  them  to  great  inconvenience  and  anxiety. And  so  concerned  were  they  to  lose  no  time,  that  the  builder,  after  the  first  floor  was  built,  gave  them  a  floor  a  week,  and  the  firm  speedily  moved  into  their  new  and  spacious  premises. But  in  process  of  time  even  these  became  too  narrow  for  them,  and  they  were  obliged  ultimately  to  take  refuge  in  the  palatial  warehouse  now  occupied  by  them  in  Ingram  Street,  which  became a  the  centre  of  an  extensive  commerce  with  all  parts  of  the  world.

Residences
Thomas Chalmers was a frequent visitor to Tullichewan and Prince Albert passed through in 1849.

Family
In  June  1822,  Mr  Campbell  married  Margaret,  second  daughter  of  Archibald  Roxburgh,  merchant and had issue-
James was born on 31 March 1823.
Archibald
William
Alexander
Adam
John
Elizabeth
Helen

Church and philanthropic work
Unlike his brother, James Campbell, William was not specially interested in public life. He was at one time elected as Town Councillor; but as the duties had no fascination for him, he soon retired. As a citizen of Glasgow he has been remembered as a philanthropist by several charitable institutions which he supported.

He assisted to found and continued to support the Night Asylum for the Houseless, and he took especial interest in the Royal Infirmary, the Indigent Gentlewomen's Fund, and the City Improvement Scheme. The Royal Botanic Garden was beyond the power of being enjoyed by the working classes during the Fair week, the very time when the pent-up crowds of Glasgow were able to take advantage of its walks and open spaces, as it was in want of funds. He contributed £500 on condition that it might be open to the public during the great annual holiday.

At the Disruption, William, unlike his brother James, left the Church of Scotland and joined with the Free Church. William, who was an elder in the Free Church, was an intimate friend of Thomas Chalmers. Millburn Free Church and its adjoining place of sepulture, at the north end of Renton, owe their origin to the Disruption of 1843, which rent asunder the  Church of Scotland. In May 1845, William convened a meeting in the Star Hotel in George Square with Free Church Ministers to discuss establishing “an Academic Institution in the City”. As a result of this meeting, The Glasgow Academy was formed. In 1845 William Campbell, laird of Tullichewan, erected at his own expense the elegant small Gothic chapel of Millburn—which was adorned with a fine ornate steeple—and also secured ample burial ground nearby. The church was opened on 14 December 1845. In May, 1846, the church was sanctioned as a separate 
charge.

References

Citations

Sources

1793 births
1864 deaths
Free Church of Scotland people